Paris Junior College (PJC) is a public community college with three campuses in Texas: Paris, Greenville, and Sulphur Springs.  The college was founded in 1924 as a campus of Paris Independent School District. Nearly 5,000 students are enrolled at the college.

Service area
As defined by the Texas Legislature, the official service area of PJC consists of the following:
the Paris Independent School District,
the part of the Prairiland Independent School District that was formerly the Cunningham School District,
the municipality of Paris, Texas,
all of Lamar and Delta counties,
the Detroit Independent School District and Clarksville Independent School District and the Rivercrest Independent School District that is in Red River County (formerly known as the Talco-Bogata Consolidated Independent School District),
the North Hopkins Independent School District, Sulphur Bluff Independent School District, Sulphur Springs Independent School District, Miller Grove Independent School District, and Cumby Independent School District, located in Hopkins County,
the Honey Grove Independent School District located in Fannin County
the Fannindel Independent School District located in Fannin and Delta counties,
all of Hunt County, except the portion located in the Terrell Independent School District, and
the portion of the Prairiland Independent School District located in Red River County.

Athletics
Their school mascot is the Dragon and the school colors are green and gold. The men's teams go by "Dragons" while the women's teams are "Lady Dragons." The athletic teams compete in the Southwest Junior College Conference of the NJCAA. PJC offers athletic scholarships in baseball, softball, and men and women's basketball.

Notable alumni
A. M. Aikin Jr. Texas state legislator and lawyer
James R. Biard (c. 1951), engineer and inventor
Brenda Cherry, civil rights activist
Marsha Farney (c. 1990), member of the Texas House of Representatives from District 20 in Williamson County
Jim Hess, former college football coach and NFL scout
Eddie Robinson Former Professional Baseball player, coach, and executive

See also
H. L. "Hub" Hollis Field

References

External links 
Official website

Universities and colleges accredited by the Southern Association of Colleges and Schools
Community colleges in Texas
Education in Lamar County, Texas
Education in Hunt County, Texas
Education in Hopkins County, Texas
Buildings and structures in Hunt County, Texas
Buildings and structures in Hopkins County, Texas
Buildings and structures in Lamar County, Texas
NJCAA athletics
1924 establishments in Texas